Olympique de Magrane is an Algerian football club based in Magrane, El Oued Province. The club currently plays in the Ligue Régionale de football de Ouargla of the Ligue Régional I.

References

Football clubs in Algeria
El Oued Province
Sports clubs in Algeria